Trudi Musgrave (born 10 September 1977) is an Australian retired tennis player.

Biography
Musgrave was born in Newcastle, New South Wales. Although she won the Junior Australian Open singles title in 1994 (the same year that Martina Hingis won the French and Wimbledon junior titles), Trudi is a doubles specialist, having been a finalist at the Wimbledon girls' doubles in 1995. Her highest ranking in doubles was 62 (in 2003).

At the peak of her career, in 2004, Trudi suffered a catastrophic knee injury while on the court during a doubles final. Most doctors thought she would not recover. A full knee reconstruction and intense physiotherapy meant that she was able to resume her career at the Australian Open in January 2005. Despite having access to a 'special ranking' that allowed her to enter major tournaments using her ranking at the time of her injury, she was unable to immediately return to the level she was before her injury. However, she has begun to regain some of her momentum and won two ITF doubles titles in 2006 with a 20–10 win–loss record for the year.

Because Trudi is based in Newcastle (a city where there no major tournaments are played), she spends up to 40 weeks a year living out of a suitcase on the circuit. When she is away from home, to make the most of her time she usually plays in a tournament every week with only an occasional rest break. Because of this, most years Trudi has played the most, or has been among those who have played the most tournaments of any of the women on the ITF Circuit in a 12-month period.

Trudi retired in February 2008. She coached for one year at the Cessnock tennis club in the Hunter Valley, NSW but did not return for the 2009 season. Musgrave retired from professional tennis 2011.

During her career, she won 41 ITF doubles and three ITF singles titles.

WTA career finals

Doubles: 1 (runner-up)

ITF Circuit finals

Singles: 9 (3–6)

Doubles: 69 (41–28)

External links
 
 

1977 births
Living people
Australian female tennis players
Australian Open (tennis) junior champions
Tennis people from New South Wales
Sportswomen from New South Wales
Sportspeople from Newcastle, New South Wales
Grand Slam (tennis) champions in girls' singles
21st-century Australian women